The 2008 college football season may refer to:

 2008 NCAA Division I FBS football season
 2008 NCAA Division I FCS football season
 2008 NCAA Division II football season
 2008 NCAA Division III football season
 2008 NAIA Football National Championship